Alchemical studies produced a number of substances, which were later classified as particular chemical compounds or mixtures of compounds.

Many of these terms were in common use into the 20th century.

Metals and metalloids 

 Antimony/ – Sb
 Bismuth – Bi
 Copper/ – associated with Venus. Cu
 Gold/ – associated with the Sun. Au
 Iron/ – associated with Mars. Fe
 Lead/ – associated with Saturn. Pb
 Quicksilver/ – associated with Mercury. Hg
 Silver/ – associated with the Moon. Ag
 Tin/ – associated with Jupiter. Sn

Minerals, stones, and pigments 
 Bluestone – mineral form of copper(II) sulfate pentahydrate, also called blue vitriol.
 Borax – sodium borate; was also used to refer to other related minerals.
 Cadmia/Tuttia/Tutty – probably zinc carbonate.
 Calamine – zinc carbonate.
 Calomel/Horn Quicksilver/horn mercury – mercury(I) chloride, a very poisonous purgative formed by subliming a mixture of mercuric chloride and metallic mercury, triturated in a mortar and heated in an iron pot. The crust formed on the lid was ground to powder and boiled with water to remove the calomel.
 Calx – calcium oxide; was also used to refer to other metal oxides.
 Chalk – a rock composed of porous biogenic calcium carbonate. CaCO3
 Chrome green – chromic oxide and cobalt oxide.
 Chrome orange – chrome yellow and chrome red.
 Chrome red – basic lead chromate – PbCrO4+PbO
 Chrome yellow/Paris Yellow/Leipzig Yellow – lead chromate, PbCrO4
 Cinnabar/Vermilion – refers to several substances, among them: mercury(II) sulfide (HgS), or native vermilion (the common ore of mercury).
 Copper Glance – copper(I) sulfide ore.
 Cuprite – copper(I) oxide ore.
 Dutch White – a pigment, formed from one part of white lead to three of barium sulfate. BaSO4
 Flowers of antimony – antimony trioxide, formed by roasting stibnite at high temperature and condensing the white fumes that form. Sb2O3
 Fool's gold – a mineral, iron disulfide or pyrite; can form oil of vitriol on contact with water and air.
 Fulminating silver – principally, silver nitride, formed by dissolving silver(I) oxide in ammonia. Very explosive when dry.
 Fulminating gold – a number of gold based explosives which "fulminate", or detonate easily.
 – gold hydrazide, formed by adding ammonia to the auric hydroxide. When dry, can explode on concussion.
 – an unstable gold carbonate formed by precipitation by potash from gold dissolved in aqua regia.
 Galena – lead(II) sulfide. Lead ore.
 Glass of antimony – impure antimony tetroxide, SbO4 formed by roasting stibnite. A yellow pigment for glass and porcelain.
 Gypsum – a mineral; calcium sulfate. CaSO4
 Horn Silver/Argentum Cornu – a weathered form of chlorargyrite, an ore of silver chloride.
 Luna cornea – silver chloride, formed by heating horn silver till it liquefies and then cooling.
 King's yellow – formed by mixing orpiment with white arsenic.
 Lapis solaris (Bologna stone) – barium sulfide – 1603, Vincenzo Cascariolo.
 Lead fume – lead oxide, found in flues at lead smelters.
 Lime/Quicklime (Burnt Lime)/Calx Viva/Unslaked Lime – calcium oxide, formed by calcining limestone
 Slaked Lime – calcium hydroxide. Ca(OH)2
 Marcasite – a mineral; iron disulfide. In moist air it turns into green vitriol, FeSO4.
 Massicot – lead monoxide. PbO
 Litharge – lead monoxide, formed by fusing and powdering massicot.
 Minium/Red Lead – trilead tetroxide, Pb3O4; formed by roasting litharge in air.
 Naples yellow/Cassel yellow – oxychloride of lead, formed by heating litharge with sal ammoniac.
 Mercurius praecipitatus – red mercuric oxide.
 Mosaic gold – stannic sulfide, formed by heating a mixture of tin filings, sulfur, and sal-ammoniac.
 Orpiment – arsenic trisulfide, an ore of arsenic.
 Pearl white – bismuth nitrate, BiNO3
 Philosophers' Wool/nix alba (white snow)/Zinc White – zinc oxide, formed by burning zinc in air, used as a pigment
 Plumbago – a mineral, graphite; not discovered in pure form until 1564
 Powder of Algaroth – antimony oxychloride, formed by precipitation when a solution of butter of antimony and spirit of salt is poured into water.
 Purple of Cassius – formed by precipitating a mixture of gold, stannous and stannic chlorides, with alkali. Used for glass coloring
 Realgar – arsenic disulfide, an ore of arsenic.
 Regulus of antimony
 Resin of copper – copper(I) chloride (cuprous chloride), formed by heating copper with corrosive sublimate.
 Rouge/Crocus/Colcothar – ferric oxide, formed by burning green vitriol in air.
 Stibnite – antimony or antimony trisulfide, ore of antimony.
 Turpeth mineral – hydrolysed form of mercury(II) sulfate.
 Verdigris – Carbonate of Copper or (more recently) copper(II) acetate. The carbonate is formed by weathering copper. The acetate is formed by vinegar acting on copper. One version was used as a green pigment.
 White arsenic – arsenious oxide, formed by sublimating arsenical soot from the roasting ovens.
 White lead – carbonate of lead, a toxic pigment, produced by corroding stacks of lead plates with dilute vinegar beneath a heap of moistened wood shavings. (replaced by blanc fixe & lithopone)
 Venetian White – formed from equal parts of white lead and barium sulfate.
 Zaffre – impure cobalt arsenate, formed after roasting cobalt ore.
 Zinc Blende – zinc sulfide.

Oils and spirits 
 Butter (or oil) of antimony – antimony trichloride. Formed by distilling roasted stibnite with corrosive sublimate, or dissolving stibnite in hot concentrated hydrochloric acid and distilling. SbCl3
 Butter of tin – hydrated tin(IV) chloride; see also , another chloride of tin.
 Oil of tartar – concentrated potassium carbonate, K2CO3 solution
 Oil of tartar per deliquium – potassium carbonate dissolved in the water which its extracts from the air.
 Oil of vitriol/Spirit of vitriol – sulfuric acid, a weak version can be formed by heating green vitriol and blue vitriol. H2SO4
 Spirit of box/Pyroxylic spirit – methanol, CH3OH, distilled wood alcohol.
 Spirit of hartshorn – ammonia, formed by the decomposition of sal-ammoniac by unslaked lime.
 Spirit of salt/ – the liquid form of hydrochloric acid (also called muriatic acid), formed by mixing common salt with oil of vitriol.
 Marine acid air – gaseous form of hydrochloric acid.

 Spirit of nitre − nitric acid

  – stannic chloride, formed by distilling tin with corrosive sublimate.

Salts 
 Glauber's salt – sodium sulfate. Na2SO4
 Sal alembroth – salt composed of chlorides of ammonium and mercury.
 Sal ammoniac – ammonium chloride.
 Sal petrae (Med. Latin: "stone salt")/Salt of Petra/Saltpetre/Nitrate of potash – potassium nitrate, KNO3, typically mined from covered dungheaps.
 Salt/Common salt – A mineral; sodium chloride, NaCl, formed by evaporating seawater (impure form).
 Salt of tartar – potassium carbonate; also called potash.
 Salt of hartshorn/Sal volatile – ammonium carbonate formed by distilling bones and horns.
 Tin salt – hydrated stannous chloride; see also , another chloride of tin.

Vitriols 
 Blue vitriol – copper(II) sulfate pentahydrate.
 Green vitriol – a mineral; iron(II) sulfate heptahydrate. (or ferrous sulfate)
 Red vitriol - cobalt sulfate.
 Sweet vitriol – diethyl ether. It could be made by mixing oil of vitriol with spirit of wine and heating it.
 White vitriol – zinc sulfate, formed by lixiviating roasted zinc blende.

Waters 
  – nitric acid, formed by 2 parts saltpetre in 1 part (pure) oil of vitriol (sulfuric acid). (Historically, this process could not have been used, as 98% oil of vitriol was not available.)
 /Spirit of turpentine/Oil of turpentine/Gum turpentine – turpentine, formed by the distillation of pine tree resin.
  (Latin: "royal water") – a mixture of aqua fortis and spirit of salt.
  – arsenic trioxide, As2O3 (extremely poisonous)
 /Spirit of Wine – ethanol, formed by distilling wine

Others 
 Alkahest – universal solvent.
 Azoth – initially this referred to a supposed universal solvent but later became another name for Mercury.
 Bitumen – highly viscous liquid or semi-solid form of petroleum.
 Blende
 Brimstone – sulfur
 Flowers of sulfur – formed by distilling sulfur.
 Caustic potash/Caustic wood alkali – potassium hydroxide, formed by adding lime to potash
 Caustic Soda/Caustic marine alkali – sodium hydroxide, NaOH, formed by adding lime to natron.
 Caustic volatile alkali – ammonium hydroxide.
 Corrosive sublimate – mercuric chloride, formed by subliming mercury, calcined green vitriol, common salt, and nitre.
 Gum Arabic – gum from the acacia tree.
 Liver of sulfur – formed by fusing potash and sulfur.
 Lunar caustic/ – silver nitrate, formed by dissolving silver in aqua fortis and evaporating.
 Lye – potash in a water solution, formed by leaching wood ashes.
 Potash – potassium carbonate, formed by evaporating lye; also called salt of tartar. K2CO3
 Pearlash – formed by baking potash in a kiln.
 Milk of sulfur – formed by adding an acid to thion hudor (lime sulfur).
 Natron/Soda Ash/Soda – sodium carbonate. Na2CO3
  – ammonium nitrate.
 Sugar of Lead – lead(II) acetate, formed by dissolving lead oxide in vinegar.
  – lime sulfur, formed by boiling flowers of sulfur with slaked lime.

See also 
 Alchemical symbol

References 

Chemistry-related lists